Benafigos is a municipality in the comarca of Alt Maestrat, Castellón Province, Valencia, Spain.

The village is located at high altitude between the Montlleó River and the Rambla de Benafigos. The climate of the village is continental with long, cold winters and hot summers, the temperature during the night on summer days is pleasant though.

References

External links

 Pàgina web de Benafigos
 País Valencià, poble a poble, comarca a comarca
 Secció "Poble a poble" del Diari Parlem
 Institut Valencià d'Estadística.
 Portal de la Direcció General d'Administració Local de la Generalitat.

Municipalities in the Province of Castellón
Alt Maestrat